Indrapuri Studios is a film and television studio located in 4, Netaji Subhash Chandra Bose Road, Tollygunge, Kolkata. This is one of the oldest and busiest Bengali film studios of Kolkata. Indrapuri Studios was established in 1935 and currently managed and owned by Tejash Doshi who is the Managing Director of Indrapuri Studios Private Limited. The studio is spread over two acres and has 6 Studio Floors.

Inspirations 
The studio plays a vital role in Gaurav Pandey's Bengali film Shukno Lanka (2010). Pandey, the director of the film told in an interview– "This comes from my love for Calcutta. Indrapuri Studios, which appears in the film so many times, is the cornerstone of cinema in Calcutta. My obsession with Indrapuri Studios began from the knowledge that Satyajitbabu (Ray) made a lot of his films there."

References 

Cinema of Bengal
Indian companies established in 1935
Recording studios in India
Buildings and structures in Kolkata
Mass media companies established in 1935